Cleveland Area Rapid Transit (known as CART) is a public transit system operating in Norman, Oklahoma. It is named after Cleveland County, Oklahoma of which Norman is county seat.

Routes

As of 2021, CART provides 5 routes in all, serving the campus of the University of Oklahoma.

32 Apartment Loop

52 Campus Loop

40 Lloyd Noble Shuttle

42 Research Shuttle

43 Research/LNC (operates only during the alternate schedule and combines both the 40 and 42)

Fares

As of 2021, CART service is free for OU students, faculty and staff with valid campus identification.

References

External links
CART home page

Norman, Oklahoma
Bus transportation in Oklahoma